The 'Fazli' mango is a mango cultivar primarily grown in Bangladesh and Indian state of West Bengal. It is a late maturing fruit, available after other varieties. Fazlis are commonly used in jams and pickles in the cuisine of the Indian subcontinent. Each mango can be quite large, going up to a kilo. Rajshahi Division in Bangladesh is the major producers of fazli. An important commercial variety, it is increasingly being exported.

In 2009, India has filed a Geographical Indication for the name Fazli, but this is likely to be shared with Bangladesh. There is a dispute over this issue regarding registration to the WTO manual by India. In 2021, it was given Geographical indication status as a product of Bangladesh.

References

Mango cultivars
Mango cultivars of India
Geographical indications in West Bengal